The 2007 WGC-Accenture Match Play Championship was a golf tournament that was played from February 21–25, 2007 over the South Course at The Gallery Golf Club at Dove Mountain in Marana, Arizona. It was the ninth WGC-Accenture Match Play Championship and the first of three World Golf Championships events held in 2007. It was the first time the championship was played at The Gallery, having previously been hosted by the La Costa Resort and Spa in Carlsbad, California.

Henrik Stenson defeated defending champion Geoff Ogilvy 2 and 1 in the 36 hole final to claim his first World Golf Championships title. The total purse was $8,000,000 of which Stenson earned $1,350,000. He also became the first player from Continental Europe to win one of the individual World Golf Championships.

Brackets
The Championship was a single elimination match play event. The field consisted of the top 64 players available from the Official World Golf Rankings, seeded according to the rankings. Number 60 Charl Schwartzel decided to play the South African PGA Championship on the Sunshine Tour in an effort to claim that Tour's Order of Merit (he was successful). Number 65 J. J. Henry took Schwartzel's place in the field.

Bobby Jones bracket

Ben Hogan bracket

Gary Player bracket

Sam Snead bracket

Final Four

Breakdown by country

Prize money breakdown

References

External links
Bracket

WGC Match Play
Golf in Arizona
WGC-Accenture Match Play Championship
WGC-Accenture Match Play Championship
WGC-Accenture Match Play Championship